George Henry Wright (15 November 1822 – 28 November 1893) was an English first-class cricketer and umpire.

Wright was born at Sheffield in November 1822. He made his debut in first-class cricket for an England XI against Nottinghamshire at Trent Bridge in 1847. The following year he made four first-class appearances for Sheffield, playing twice each against Manchester and Nottingham. He played first-class cricket for sides representing Yorkshire/Sheffield on nineteen occasions until 1855. Additionally, he played nine first-class matches for the North between 1851–57, five matches each for an England XI and a United Eleven until 1857, two matches each for an All-England Eleven and Manchester in 1857–58, and one appearance for the Players in the Gentlemen v Players match of 1856. In a total 44 first-class matches, Wright scored 741 runs at an average of 10.15 and a high score of 68. With the ball, he took 88 wickets at a bowling average of 10.36. He took five wickets in an innings on four occasions, with best figures of 7 for 38 for Sheffield against Manchester in 1852.

In addition to playing, Wright also stood as umpire in sixteen first-class matches between 1860–72. He was the groundsman at Bramall Lane from 1866 until his death in November 1893.

References

External links

1822 births
1893 deaths
Cricketers from Sheffield
English cricketers
Non-international England cricketers
Yorkshire cricketers
Sheffield Cricket Club cricketers
North v South cricketers
All-England Eleven cricketers
United All-England Eleven cricketers
Players cricketers
Manchester Cricket Club cricketers
English cricket umpires